GAMA is a department store in George Town, Penang, Malaysia. Located at Dato Keramat Road, just opposite Komtar, GAMA was opened in 1967, making it the oldest department store in the State of Penang. In spite of competition from the nearby shopping malls, the department store still retains its customer base due to its cheaper pricing. The shopping centre contains a total of eight floors, including its basement parking lot.

History
GAMA' was originally founded as the Pulau Pinang Supermarket by Mr Chang Cheng Guan, Mr Tan Peck Yong and Mr Chia Siak Leng. Mr Chang Cheng Guan is a Kedah-born entrepreneur who had been impressed by Singapore's booming retail scene at the time  Mr Tan Peck Yong and Mr Chia Siak Leng were both Singapore-born entrepreneur who had the vision for importing goods from China when it wasn't popular at the time. Launched in 1967, the supermarket was initially located at Penang Road, adjacent to the famous Chowrasta Market.

The supermarket was then relocated in 1980 to its present location at Dato Keramat Road, which was formerly the site of a government gunpowder depot. Concurrently, the supermarket was renamed as GAMA. At the time of its opening, GAMA was the largest shopping centre in Penang.

Retail outlets 
The supermarket and department store is divided into eight floors, with each floor containing separate retail categories. The basement level is the parking lot. For groceries can be found in ground floor. For instance, apparel and accessories can be found at the first, second, third and fourth floors, while home appliances are offered at the fifth floor & sixth floor. Seventh floor is the new renovation food court.

Location 
GAMA is situated in the centre of George Town, directly opposite Komtar, the administrative centre of Penang. It is sited at the intersection of Dato Keramat Road and Brick Kiln Road (now Gurdwara Road). Rapid Penang bus routes 201, 202, 203, 204, 206, 301, 304 and 502 include a stop at the department store. Due to GAMA's proximity to Komtar, the department store can also be accessed from Komtar on foot.

See also 
 List of shopping malls in Malaysia
 The Malaysia Book of Records
 Penang

References

External links 
 GAMA Supermarket and Departmental Store

Shopping malls in Penang
Shopping malls established in 1980
1980 establishments in Malaysia
Buildings and structures in George Town, Penang